The Gazelle Group (also known as Gazelle Colleges or Gazelle Colleges Group) was an association of United Kingdom further education colleges which claimed to promote entrepreneurship. It has been widely criticised for its accounting practises and most of its affiliate members have left the organisation. To date, no one has been held accountable for the failures of the organisation. It was founded in 2011 or January 2012.

Members
There are 22 member colleges :

England
 Amersham & Wycombe College, Buckinghamshire
 Barking and Dagenham College, London
Carlisle College, Cumbria
 City College Norwich, Norfolk
 City College Plymouth, Devon
City of Bath College, Somerset
 City of Liverpool College, Merseyside
 Gateshead College, Tyne and Wear
 Gloucestershire College, Gloucestershire 
 Highbury College, Portsmouth 
 LeSoCo: Lewisham College, incorporating Southwark College, London
 Middlesbrough College, Middlesbrough
 New College Nottingham, Nottinghamshire
 North Hertfordshire College, Hertfordshire
 Oxford and Cherwell Valley College, Oxfordshire
Peterborough Regional College, Cambridgeshire
Preston's College, Lancashire
 The Sheffield College, South Yorkshire
 Warwickshire College
 Walsall College, West Midlands

Northern Ireland
 South West College

Scotland
 Glasgow Kelvin College

Wales
 Cardiff and Vale College

References

External links

College and university associations and consortia in the United Kingdom
Further education colleges in the United Kingdom